After first competing in 1938, Fiji returned to the British Empire Games in 1950 in Auckland, New Zealand. The colony sent only male competitors. They entered a total of six events in athletics, and three events in lawn bowls.

The 1950 Games have been Fiji's most successful to date. Fiji competitors won a total of 5 medals (including one gold), and finished 8th (out of 12) on the medal table.

Medals

Gold

Athletics
 Men's shot put: Mataika Tuicakau: 48' 0¼" (14.63m)

Silver

Athletics
 Men's discus throw: Mataika Tuicakau: 144' 2½" (44.00m)
 Men's javelin: Luke Tunabuna: 183' 9½" (56.02m)

Bronze

Lawn bowls
 Men's doubles: Leslie Brown and James Poulton: 41 points
 Men's singles: Lionel F. Garnett: 90 points

Sources
 Fiji results for the 1950 Games, Commonwealth Games Federation

Nations at the 1950 British Empire Games
Fiji at the Commonwealth Games
1950 in Fijian sport